Rooster's Breakfast is a Slovenian drama released in 2007. It is an adaptation of less known novel of the same name by Feri Lainšček. The film is the most acclaimed and most successful Slovenian films of all times, and also the third most successful movie in Slovenia, following Titanic and Troy.

Plot
The film takes place in the Mura Valley, in the vicinity of Gornja Radgona. David Slavinec, nicknamed Đuro (Primož Bezjak) has recently been laid off from his job. However, his former boss points him to a new job at the automechanic shop owned by his acquaintance Pišti Gajaš (Vlado Novak), which he gladly accepts. Gajaš is an experienced, but somewhat naive local car mechanic who frequently talks about the past times when, in his opinion, life was much better for the ordinary people. His friends frequently visit him to play cards and discuss the events happening around them.

Cveto Vuksanović - Lepec, (Dario Varga) the town's biggest thug and the owner of the local night club, frequently visits Gajaš to repair his Mercedes. Gajaš always repairs the car for him although Lepec always finds an excuse not to pay the bill immediately, preferring payments in various small favors to Gajaš and his friends. One day, Đuro meets Bronja, (Pia Zemljič), the wife of Lepec who brings in her car for repair. One day she asks Đuro to drive her to Austria to get some pills for her friend. They soon start meeting each other. On one occasion she tells Đuro that she and her husband have become estranged after the birth of their daughter and the pills were meant to cure her severe nervous breakdown. Đuro and Bronja start a passionate affair, which Gajaš discovers, but keeps hidden from Lepec, who nevertheless becomes suspicious when he finds the lighter forgotten by Đuro in their bedroom.

In the meantime, Gajaš dreams about Severina, a well-known Croatian pop star, who is on tour in the town. When Lepec drives his car in for a repair again, Gajaš demands he pays the debts from the past. This time Lepec pays him some money and gives a promise he will bring Severina to his place to have a dinner with him. Late that evening, Severina comes and joins Gajaš at the dinner.
The next morning Gajaš joyfully tells Đuro that he had "rooster's breakfast" (i.e. morning sex) with Severina, but Đuro tells him that the girl he slept with wasn't the real Severina, but a lookalike prostitute. Soon Lepec appears and spots a necklace given to Đuro by Bronja, thus discovering their affair. After a quarrel with Lepec, Gajaš pulls out the gun and shoots Lepec before he can strike Đuro. Some time later, Đuro visits Gajaš in prison who orders him to take over his workshop and to maintain it in such order as did he. He then settles there with Bronja and her daughter.

Cast
Vlado Novak - Pišti Gajaš
Primož Bezjak - David Slavinec (Đuro)
Pia Zemljič - Bronja Vuksanović 
Dario Varga - Cveto Vuksanović (Lepec)
Janez Škof - Jure Cekuta
Davor Janjić - Rajko Malačič (Roki)
Miloš Battelino - Igor Pavlica
Matija Rozman - Viktor Brodnik (Zobar)
Bojan Emeršič - Radmilovič

Awards

The film won 5 awards at the 10th Festival of Slovenian Film. It was also the Slovenian candidate for the Academy Award for Best Foreign Film nomination in 2009 (81st Academy Awards).

 2007 – Award for best film by choice of audiences at the 10th Slovenian Film Festival in Portorož for the feature film ROOSTER’S BREAKFAST (Slovenia, Europe)
 2007 – Award for best directing at the 10th Slovenian Film Festival in Portorož for the feature film ROOSTER’S BREAKFAST (Slovenia, Europe)
 2007 – Award for best screenplay at the 10th Slovenian Film Festival in Portorož for the feature film ROOSTER’S BREAKFAST (Slovenia, Europe)
 2007 - Stop Magazine Award at the 10th Slovenian Film Festival in Portorož for best actor/actress (Pia Zemljič) (Slovenia, Europe)
 2007 – Viktor Award for special achievements – for successful distribution of the feature film ROOSTER’S BREAKFAST (Slovenia, Europe)
 2009 – Golden Bird Award for film achievements for the feature film ROOSTER’S BREAKFAST (Slovenia, Europe)
 2009 – Critics Award at the 4th Annual South East European Film Festival, Cinema Without Borders, Los Angeles for best feature film ROOSTER’S BREAKFAST (Los Angeles, USA)

References

Further information
 http://www.petelinjizajtrk.com/

External links 
 

Slovenian drama films
Films set in Slovenia
2007 films